Charles Cureton  may refer to:

Charles Robert Cureton (1789–1848), British Army officer and Adjutant-General (India).
Sir Charles Cureton (Indian Army officer) (1826–1891), son of above